Kinnikuman, also known as Ultimate Muscle, has had one TV special and seven theatrically released movies.

Main cast
The following is the voice cast of the main characters of the series as they appear in each film. The voice cast for movie only characters are listed with the movies in which they appear.
Akira Kamiya as Kinnikuman (all movies and TV Special)
Minori Matsushima as Meat-kun (all movies and TV Special)
Hideyuki Tanaka as Terryman (all movies and TV Special)
Eiji Kanie as Ramenman (movies 1-4 and TV Special)
Banjou Ginga as Ramenman (movies 5-7)
Daisuke Gouri as Robin Mask (all movies)
Ryōichi Tanaka as Warsman (TV Special)
Hideyuki Hori as Warsman (all movies)
Kaneto Shiozawa as Geronimo (movies 4-7)
Masaharu Satou as Buffaloman (movies 3-8) and Iwao (all movies and TV Special)
Tetsuo Mizutori as Brocken Jr. (all movies and TV Special) and Yosaku (movies 1, 3-7, and TV Special)
Masashi Hirose as Rikishiman (all movies and TV Special)
Hiroshi Ohtake as Kazuo Nakano (TV Special)
Sanji Hase as Kazuo Nakano (all movies)
Chisato Nakajima as Mari Nikaidō (all movies and TV Special)
Hiromi Tsuru as Natsuko Shōno (all movies and TV Special)
Keiko Yamamoto as Nachiguron (all movies and TV Special) and Kinkotsu-Obaba (movies 3-7)
Kazuhiko Kishino as Mayumi Kinniku (all movies and TV Special)
Nana Yamaguchi as Sayuri Kinniku (all movies and TV Special)
Yonehiko Kitagawa as Chairman Harabote (all movies and TV Special)
Kouji Totani as Announcer (movies 2-6) and Gobugari (all movies and TV Special)
Issei Futamata as Kinkotsuman (all movies and TV Special)

Showdown! The 7 Justice Supermen vs. The Space Samurais

Showdown! The 7 Justice Supermen vs. The Space Samurais (決戦!7人の正義超人vs宇宙野武士, Kessen! Shichinin no Seigi Choujin vs Uchuu Nobushi)

A TV Special first aired April 7, 1984. It covers the Planet Rakka story arc. A young boy from Planet Rakka named Beansman asks Kinnikuman and the others to help save his planet from the Space Samurai's led by Black King.  The story was a parody of The Seven Samurai.

Cast
Satomi Majima as Beansman
Jouji Yanami as Ingen
Chisato Nakajima as Princess Marron
Masashi Hirose as Robo Choujin
Issei Futamata as Yondai Susuna

The Space Samurais
Ichiro Nagai as Black King
Yonehiko Kitagawa as Black Sumoman
Kazuhiko Kishino as Black Killer
Hideyuki Tanaka as Black Fighter
Kouji Totani as Black Knight
Issei Futamata as Black Kung Fu
Masaharu Satou as Black Tomahawk

Kinnikuman: Stolen Championship Belt
Kinnikuman: Stolen Championship Belt (キン肉マン 奪われたチャンピオンベルト, Kinnikuman Ubawareta Chanpion Beruto)

Release Date: July 14, 1984
Released With: The Kabocha Wine, Chodenshi Bioman, Uchuu Keiji Shaider
Rivals: Octopus Dragon, Mouko-seijin, Harigorasu, Ukon, AmeRug Boss, Gammalar
Yudetamago Cameo: Octopus Dragon's Minions

Great Riot! Justice Superman
Great Riot! Justice Superman (大暴れ!正義超人, Ō Abare! Seigi Choujin)

Release Date: December 22, 1984
Released With: Dr. Slump and Arale-chan: Hoyoyo! The Treasure of Nanaba Castle and Uchuu Keiji Shaider: Follow the Shigishigi Kidnapping Gang!
Rivals: Black Emperor, Shishkeba Boo, Great Ukon, Black Buffalo, Black Knight, Black Rain, Black Menrui, Black Bear, Black Sumo, Black Satan
Yudetamago Cameo: Black Emperor's Minions

Justice Supermen vs. Ancient Supermen
Justice Supermen vs. Ancient Supermen (正義超人vs古代超人, Seigi Choujin vs Koudai Choujin)

Release Date: March 16, 1985
Released With: Gu Gu Ganmo, Dengeki Sentai Changeman and Tongari Bōshi no Memoru
Rivals: Satan King, Stone Satan, Condor Satan, Eye Satan, Jaws Satan, Cobra Satan, Haniwa Satan, Saurus Satan
Yudetamago Cameo: Ukon III

Counterattack! The Underground Space Choujin

 is the fourth theatrical film based on the anime series Kinnikuman. It was released in Japan on July 13, 1985 alongside Dr. Slump and Arale-chan: Hoyoyo! Dream Capital Mecha Police, Captain Tsubasa: Great Europe Play-Off, and Dengeki Sentai Changeman: Shuttle Base Showdown. It is set after the Golden Mask Arc. It is the first film to feature the character Geronimo and the last film where Eiji Kanie supplies the voice of Ramenman. It is also the shortest film of the series. It is based on the Kinnikuman special chapter .

Released With: Dr. Slump and Arale-chan: Hoyoyo! Dream Capital Mecha Police, Captain Tsubasa: Great Europe Play-Off, and Dengeki Sentai Changeman: Shuttle Base Showdown
Rivals: Hydra King, Hydra Būton, Hydra Gun, Hydra Sumo, Hydra Indy, New Sunshine, New Ashuraman, New Black Hole, New Black Rain
Yudetamago Cameo: Ukon Jr.
Opening Theme:  by Akira Kushida
Closing Theme:  by Akira Kamiya (Kinnikuman) and Minori Matsushima (Meat-kun)

New characters

Cast

Hour of Triumph! Justice Superman

 is the fifth theatrical film based on the anime series Kinnikuman. It was released in Japan on December 21, 1985 alongside Captain Tsubasa: Watch Out, All Japan Jr.! and GeGeGe no Kitaro. It is set during the Dream Choujin Tag Arc.

It is the first film to feature Banjō Ginga as the voice of Ramenman (due to Eiji Kanie's death in October 1985) and the last to feature Kōji Yada. It is also the second film to feature the character Kinkotsu-Obaba, who had been omitted from the previous film.

Released With: Captain Tsubasa: Watch Out, All Japan Jr.! and GeGeGe no Kitarō
Rivals: Shuten Doji, The Nio, The Umibōzun, The Ninjaman, The Sanzokūn
Yudetamago Cameo: Ukonnosuke
Opening Theme:  by Akira Kushida
Closing Theme:  by Akira Kamiya (Kinnikuman)

New characters

Cast

Crisis in New York!

 is the sixth theatrical film based on the anime series Kinnikuman. It was released in Japan on March 15, 1986 alongside Captain Tsubasa: Race Towards Tomorrow, GeGeGe no Kitarō: The Great Yōkai War, and  Choushinsei Flashman. It is set after the Dream Choujin Tag Arc.

This was the last film to feature a cameo from series creators Yudetamago. It was also the second and last film to feature the Announcer. The villain in the film is Akuma Shogun, who appeared in the original manga and anime series as the leader of the Devil Knights during the Golden Mask Arc. Hidekatsu Shibata returns as the main antagonist of this film, having previously played that role in Great Riot! Seigi Choujin.

Released With: Captain Tsubasa: Race Towards Tomorrow, GeGeGe no Kitarō: The Great Yōkai War, and Choushinsei Flashman
Rivals: Akuma Shogun
Yudetamago Cameo: Inspector Ukon
Opening Theme:  by Akira Kushida
Closing Theme:  by Akira Kamiya (Kinnikuman)

New characters

Cast

Justice Supermen vs. Fighter Supermen

 is the seventh and final theatrical film based on the anime series Kinnikuman. It was released in Japan on December 20, 1986 alongside GeGeGe no Kitarō: Crash!! The Great Rebellion of the Multi-Dimensional Yōkai and Dragon Ball: The Legend of Shen Long.

The character Neptuneman appeared in the original manga and anime as the main antagonist of the Dream Choujin Tag Arc. Chikao Ōtsuka returns as one of the main antagonists of this film, having previously played that role in Stolen Championship Belt.

Release Date: December 20, 1986
Released With: GeGeGe no Kitarō: Crash!! The Great Rebellion of the Multi-Dimensional Yōkai and Dragon Ball: The Legend of Shen Long
Rivals: Iron Mask, Big Shinjō, Myō'ō, Senju Kan, Tōhōten, Nioman, Magorakasu, The Kongō, Great Ukon the 2nd, Paper
Opening Theme:  by Akira Kushida
Closing Theme:  by Akira Kamiya (Kinnikuman)

New characters

Cast

Kinnikuman II Sei
Two theatrically released movies were made for the sequel series Kinnikuman II Sei. The first was made before the anime television series began. The villains from both films return during the Choujin Olympics in the anime television series as the second movie is non-canon because Cyborg gang does not remember him.

Cast
Masaya Onosaka as Mantaro Kinniku (both movies)
Konami Yoshida as Alexandria Meat (both movies)
Ryoutarou Okiayu as Kevin Mask (second movie)
Toshiyuki Morikawa as Terry the Kid (both movies)
Yasunori Masutani as Gazelleman (both movies)
Ginzō Matsuo as Seiuchin (first movie)
Takumi Yamazaki as Seiuchin (second movie)
Fumiko Orikasa as Rinko Nikaidou (second movie)
Ai Nonaka as Keiko (second movie)
Reiko Kiuchi as Tamaki (second movie)
Mahito Ōba as Announcer Yoshigai (both movies)
Naoki Tatsuta as Kazuo Nakano (both movies)

Kinnikuman: Second Generations

(キン肉マンII世, Kinnikuman II Sei)

Released in 2001 alongside Motto! Ojamajo Doremi ~Secret of the Frog Stone~ and Digimon Tamers. The fans Shimada-san and Nakai-san are based on Kinnikuman creators Takashi Shimada and Yoshinori Nakai (Yudetamago). The ending theme, "Muscle Beat", was performed by famous martial artist Nobuaki Kakuda, who also provided the opening narration.

Plot
While the New Generation Choujins are taking part in Fan Appreciation Day, The Cyborg arrives, takes Meat hostage, and challenges Mantarou to a fight inside Tokyo Tower.

Cast
Akio Ōtsuka as The Cyborg
Junko Noda as Kensuke
Keiichirō Yamamoto as Shimada-san
Hirofumi Tanaka as Nakai-san
Yasuhiko Kawazu as Ring Announcer
Nobuaki Kakuda as Narrator
Akira Kamiya as Kinnikuman I (Suguru)

Muscle Ginseng Competition! The Great Choujin War

(マッスル人参争奪！超人大戦争, Massuru Ninjin Soudatsu! Choujin Dai Sensou)

Plot
In order to save a princess, Mantarou and the gang must find a special ginseng. They are later joined by Kevin Mask.

Cast
Megumi Urawa as Arenanda
Akiko Nakagawa as Princess Darenanda
Yudetamago (as Takashi Shimada) as Cannon Choujin
Hozumi Gouda as Baron Maximillion
Bin Shimada as Dazzle
Shinichirou Ohta as The Protector
Yasuhiro Takato as El Kaerun

References

External links

Kinnikuman
Kinnikuman
Lists of films based on manga